Trillium camschatcense is a species of flowering plant in the family Melanthiaceae. It is found in the moist forests of East Asia, in Japan (Hokkaido and northern Honshu), Korea, China (Jilin Province), and eastern Russia (Kamchatka, Kuril Islands, Sakhalin, Primorye, and Khabarovsk).

The plant grows in richly wooded areas, often on steep hillsides.

References

Case, Frederick W. and Case, Roberta B. (1997) Trilliums.

External links
 
 Plantarium.ru: Определитель растений on-line, Trillium camschatcense Ker Gawl. Описание таксона — in Russian with numerous color photos.
  Molbiol.ru: Викимарт, все интернет-магазины в одном месте, Доска объявлений: Триллиум камчатский (Trillium camschatcense)  — in Russian with numerous color photos.

camschatcense
Flora of Japan
Flora of Korea
Flora of Jilin
Flora of the Russian Far East
Plants described in 1805